Psephology (from Greek ) or political analysis is a branch of  political science, the "quantitative analysis of elections and balloting". As such, psephology attempts to explain elections using the scientific method. Psephology is related to political forecasting.

Psephology uses historical precinct voting data, public opinion polls, campaign finance information and similar statistical data. The term was coined in 1948 in the United Kingdom by W. F. R. Hardie (1902–1990) after he was asked by his friend R. B. McCallum for a word to describe the study of elections; first written use in 1952. Social choice theory is a different field of study that studies voting from a mathematical perspective.

'Psephology' as a term is more common in Britain and in those English-speaking communities that rely heavily on the British standard of the language. In the United States, the term 'political analysis' is more often used.

Etymology
The term draws from the Greek word for pebble as the ancient Greeks used pebbles to vote. (Similarly, the word ballot is derived from the medieval French word "ballotte," meaning a small ball).

Applications

Psephology is a division of political science that deals with the examination as well as the statistical analysis of elections and polls. People who practice psephology are called psephologists.

A few of the major tools that are used by a psephologist are historical precinct voting data, campaign finance information, and other related data. Public opinion polls also play an important role in psephology. Psephology also has various applications specifically in analysing the results of election returns for current indicators, as opposed to predictive purposes. For instance, the Gallagher Index measures the amount of proportional representation in an election.

Degrees in psephology are not offered (instead, a psephologist might have a degree in political science and/or statistics). Knowledge of demographics, statistical analysis and politics (especially electoral systems and voting behaviour) are prerequisites for becoming a psephologist.

Notable psephologists

Notable psephologists include: 
 Antony Green, election analyst for the Australian Broadcasting Corporation since 1991; 
 Malcolm Mackerras (who devised the Mackerras pendulum); 
 Michael Barone, who has co-authored The Almanac of American Politics biennially since 1972; 
 David Andrews, who since 1973 has led the Canadian network CTV's analysis and "calling" of dozens of federal and elections and referendums; 
 Nate Silver, whose website FiveThirtyEight tracks U.S. voting trends; 
 Andrew S. Tannenbaum and Christopher Bates, who together write the daily electoral-vote.com website, which tracks polling for US presidential and congressional elections;
 Canada's Éric Grenier at threehundredeight.com; 
 David Butler and Robert McKenzie, who co-developed the swingometer; 
 John Curtice, who has a strong track record of forecasting UK elections; 
 Charlie Cook, publisher of The Cook Political Report; 
 Thomas Ferguson, for his Investment theory of party competition; 
 V.C. Sekhar, an Indian academic; 
 William Bowe of the Australian Poll Bludger; 
 Curtis Gans, author of Voter Turnout in the United States, 1788–2009; and 
 Michael Gallagher who devised the Gallagher index.

See also

 British Polling Council
 Electoral Calculus
 Electoral geography
 Opinion poll
 Political analyst
 Political data scientists
 Political forecasting
 Swing (politics)
 Types of democracy

References

Further reading
 William Safire. New Political Dictionary, Random House, New York 1993.

External links

 'Psephos' Dr. Adam Carr's Elections Archive
 International IDEA – International Organisation providing (amongst other things) statistical analysis of elections and electoral systems
 ACE Project – Information resource for electoral design and administration. Includes comparative data on elections and electoral systems